Jonas Grof (born 3 May 1996) is a German professional basketball player for VFL Astrostars Bochum of the German ProA league.

References

External links
Phoenix Hagen Bio
German Basketball Federation Profile
Scout Basketball Profile

1996 births
Living people
German men's basketball players
Lee Academy (Maine) alumni
People from Herdecke
Sportspeople from Arnsberg (region)
Phoenix Hagen players
Point guards